The 2021 South Point 400 was a NASCAR Cup Series race held on September 26, 2021, at Las Vegas Motor Speedway in Las Vegas. Contested over 267 laps on the  asphalt intermediate speedway, it was the 30th race of the 2021 NASCAR Cup Series season, the fourth race of the Playoffs, and the first race of the Round of 12.

Report

Background

Las Vegas Motor Speedway, located in Clark County, Nevada outside the Las Vegas city limits and about 15 miles northeast of the Las Vegas Strip, is a  complex of multiple tracks for motorsports racing. The complex is owned by Speedway Motorsports, Inc., which is headquartered in Charlotte, North Carolina.

Entry list
 (R) denotes rookie driver.
 (i) denotes driver who are ineligible for series driver points.

Qualifying
Kyle Larson was awarded the pole for the race as determined by competition-based formula.

Starting Lineup

Race

Kyle Larson started on the pole for the race. Four cars (#10, #19, #24, #66) dropped to the rear for multiple inspection failures. Larson won stage one. Following an incident with Joey Gase only five laps into the run, most cars pitted with the four Hendrick Motorsports cars choosing to stay out. The Hendrick cars thought they were on the outside of the fuel window, but due to an extended caution the cars that pitted were able to make it to stage two. This forced the Hendrick cars to pit under green, forcing them a lap down. Chase Elliott was able to un-lap himself, and William Byron earned the lucky dog pass. Denny Hamlin won stage two and went on to win the race, beating Elliott by 0.442 seconds.

Stage Results

Stage One
Laps: 80

Stage Two
Laps: 80

Final Stage Results

Stage Three
Laps: 107

Race statistics
 Lead changes: 21 among 10 different drivers
 Cautions/Laps: 4 for 21
 Red flags: 0
 Time of race: 2 hours, 46 minutes and 8 seconds
 Average speed:

Media

Television
NBC Sports covered the race on the television side. Rick Allen, Jeff Burton, Steve Letarte and Dale Earnhardt Jr. called the race from the broadcast booth. Dave Burns and Kelli Stavast handled the pit road duties from pit lane.

Radio
PRN had the radio call for the race, which was also simulcast on Sirius XM NASCAR Radio. Doug Rice and Mark Garrow called the race from the booth when the field raced through the tri-oval. Rob Albright called the race from a billboard in turn 2 when the field raced through turns 1 and 2 & Pat Patterson called the race from a billboard outside of turn 3 when the field raced through turns 3 and 4. Brad Gillie, Brett McMillan and Wendy Venturini handled the duties on pit lane.

Standings after the race

Drivers' Championship standings

Manufacturers' Championship standings

Note: Only the first 16 positions are included for the driver standings.

References

South Point 400
South Point 400
South Point 400
NASCAR races at Las Vegas Motor Speedway